Mona (1970) (also promoted as Mona; the Virgin Nymph) is a sexually explicit adult film that contains a number of unsimulated non-penetrative sex scenes as well as penetrative ones. The film is regarded as the second sexually explicit film to receive a general theatrical release in the United States, after Blue Movie (1969). Unlike Blue Movie (which was shot without a script), Mona had a plot, though there was more emphasis on the action.

Mona helped pave the way for other films containing unsimulated sex scenes that subsequently appeared in theaters, during the Golden Age of Porn (1969–1984); and was a big influence on later films of the genre. Deep Throat (1972), for example, borrowed elements of Mona's plot.

Mona was produced by Bill Osco and directed by Michael Benveniste and Howard Ziehm, though the film was screened without credits due to legal concerns. The earnings from the film, believed to be $2 million, helped finance the directors' later film Flesh Gordon (1974). The team also produced another adult movie Harlot (1971), and Bill Osco later produced the similarly explicit Alice in Wonderland (1976).

Plot
Mona (Fifi Watson) and her fiancé Jim (Orrin North) are having a picnic, and they both strip and began to make love, but she halts him claiming that she had promised her mother (Judy Angel) that she wouldn't have intercourse until marriage. However, she joyfully performs fellatio on Jim. When she comes home, her mother reminds her of her promise and that the mother as well had been a virgin before marrying her father, who had been a good man. Then Mona remembers being little and wanting to play with her father (who is only to be seen from the hip downwards), who urges her to perform fellatio on him. Going outside again, she again performs fellatio, on a complete stranger. Afterward, a prostitute (Susan Stewart) performs cunnilingus on her. Jim, on the other hand, stops by Mona's house and has sex with her mother. In a movie theatre, Mona masturbates and performs fellatio on a nearby male patron (Gerard Broulard). Jim catches them and tells her that he'll punish her by calling all the people she had oral sex with. Jim ties Mona to a bed, and all of her previous partners surround her and engage in a very long, intense oral sex party. At the end of the film, Mona and her mother both confess their sexual affairs.

Cast
 Judy Angel (Uncredited) as Mona's mother
 Gerard Broulard (Uncredited) as movie theater patron
 Orrin North (Uncredited) as Jim
 Susan Stewart (Uncredited) as a prostitute
 Fifi Watson (Uncredited) as Mona

References

External links

Sex in the Movies Guide

1970 films
1970s pornographic films
Sexual revolution
1970s English-language films